Joyce Tenneson (born May 29, 1945) is an American fine art photographer known for her distinctive style of photography, which often involves nude or semi-nude women.

Biography
Tenneson earned her master's degree in photography from George Washington University after starting as a model for Polaroid. She left her job as a photography professor at 39, and moved from Washington to New York. Tenneson shoots primarily with the Polaroid 20x24 camera. In an interview with a photography magazine, Tenneson advised artists: "I very strongly believe that if you go back to your roots, if you mine that inner territory, you can bring out something that is indelibly you and authentic - like your thumbprint. It's going to have your style because there is no one like you." As a child, her parents worked on the grounds of a convent, which is where she grew up with her two sisters.  She and her sister "were 
enlisted to be in holiday pageants and processions. It was a mysterious environment - something out of Fellini - filled with symbolism, ritual, beauty, and also a disturbing kind of surreal imagery."

Her work has been displayed in more than 100 exhibitions around the world. Tenneson has had cover images on several magazines including Time, Life, Entertainment Weekly, Newsweek, Premiere, Esquire and The New York Times Magazine.

Awards
In 1989, Tenneson received the "Infinity" award from the International Center of Photography, and in 1990 received Women in Photography International's "Photographer of the Year" award.

In 2005, Tenneson received the Lucie Award for "Professional Fine Art Photographer of the Year."

In 2012, Tenneson received the Lifetime Achievement Award from Professional Photographers of America.

In 2018, Tenneson received the Lucie Award for Achievement in Portraiture.

In 2021, Tenneson was inducted into the International Photography Hall of Fame.

Books
In/Sights (1978)
Joyce Tenneson Photographs (1984) 
Au-Dela (1989) 
Transformations (1993) 
Illuminations (1997) 
Light Warriors (2000) 
Wise Women (2002) 
Flower Portraits (2003) 
Intimacy (2004) 
Amazing Men (2004) 
A Life in Photography (2008) 
Shells: Nature's Exquisite Creations (2011)

Major Exhibitions 
 Joyce Tenneson - Botanical Beauty, Vanderbilt University Fine Arts Gallery, Nashville, TN (2018)

References

Further reading
 
 Joyce, Eleanor. "Joyce Tenneson: Revealing Veils". Kalliope, a journal of women's art and literature. 20(2), 24-34.

External links
 Official site

1945 births
Living people
American photographers
Fine art photographers
Artists from Maine
Photographers from Maine
20th-century American women photographers
20th-century American photographers
21st-century American women